Cherepanovo is a town and the administrative center of Cherepanovsky District in Novosibirsk Oblast, Russia, located  southeast of Novosibirsk, the administrative center of the oblast. Population:

History
It was founded in 1912 due to the construction of a railway between Novonikolayevsk and Barnaul. The Cherepanovo station was opened in 1915. It was granted town status in 1925.

Administrative and municipal status
Within the framework of administrative divisions, Cherepanovo serves as the administrative center of Cherepanovsky District. As an administrative division, it is incorporated within Cherepanovsky District as the Town of Cherepanovo. As a municipal division, the Town of Cherepanovo is incorporated within Cherepanovsky Municipal District as Cherepanovo Urban Settlement.

References

Notes

Sources

External links
Official website of Cherepanovo 
Cherepanovo Business Directory 

Cities and towns in Novosibirsk Oblast